The Bungku–Tolaki languages (also known as Bungku–Mori in older literature)  are a group of languages spoken primarily in South East Sulawesi province, Indonesia, and in neighboring parts of Central and South Sulawesi provinces.

Languages

Mead (1998:117) presents the following tree-model classification for Bungku–Tolaki.  This classification is based on the historical-comparative method in linguistics.
Eastern
Moronene
East Coast: Bungku, Bahonsuai, Kulisusu (Koroni, Kulisusu, Taloki), Wawonii, Mori Bawah
Western
Interior: Mori Atas, Padoe, Tomadino
West Coast: Tolaki, Rahambuu, Kodeoha, Waru
This classification supersedes Mead (1999), an earlier classification proposed by Mead in 1994. Based on a lexicostatistical comparison, his earlier classification proposed 'Bungku,' 'Mori,' and 'Tolaki' as primary subdivisions under Bungku–Tolaki.  In view of more recent evidence from shared sound change and innovations in pronoun sets, the unity of the proposed Mori group (comprising Bahonsuai, Mori Bawah, Mori Atas, Padoe and Tomadino) could not be maintained.  Additional information can be found at Mori language.

Phonology
The sound system of all Bungku–Tolaki is characterized by a simple five-vowel system and the complete lack of final consonants.

Reconstruction

Proto-Bungku–Tolaki has been reconstructed by Mead (1998).

References

 
Celebic languages